Keijar (Keder) is a Papuan language of Indonesia used mainly by older adults.

References

Languages of western New Guinea
Endangered Papuan languages
Orya–Tor languages